Greatest Hits, released on July 20, 1999, on Reprise Records, is a Gospel music album by the American contemporary Gospel music group Take 6.

Track listing
 "I L-O-V-E U" (from So Much 2 Say)
 "Destiny"
 "One and the Same" (featuring CeCe Winans) (previously unreleased)
 "Fly Away" (from So Cool)
 "Mary" (from Take 6)
 "Biggest Part of Me" (from Join the Band)
 "The Best Stuff in the World Today Café" (previously unreleased)
 "Septembro (Brazilian Wedding Song)" (from Boyz n the Hood soundtrack, also available Quincy Jones' album Back on the Block)
 "A Quiet Place" (from Take 6)
 "Oh Thou That Tellest Good Tidings to Zion" (from Handel's Messiah: A Soulful Celebration)
 "U Turn" (from Joe Sample's album Spellbound)
 "Spread Love" (from Take 6)
 "So Much 2 Say" (from So Much 2 Say)

Take 6 albums
1999 greatest hits albums
Reprise Records compilation albums